The Gymnasiade, or World Gymnasiade, or World School Sport Games, or ISF World School Sport Games is an international multi-sport event which is organised by the International School Sport Federation (ISF). It is the largest event among many other sport events held by the ISF. Aligned with the philosophy of the organisation, only individuals between the ages of 13 and 18 are eligible to compete.

The current regulations estipulate that the program of Gymnasiade is composed of twelve mandatory individual sports with five optional sports (three optional sports, along with two additional, chosen by the organizing committee) . The current obligatory sports are: archery, athletics, boxing, chess, fencing, gymnastics, judo, karate, swimming, taekwondo, tennis, and wrestling. At the last edition held in 2018, the organizing committee chose as optional sports: petanque, road cycling, surfing, and golf.

The first edition of the Gymnasiade was held in 1974 in Wiesbaden, Germany and it featured solely gymnastics, athletics and swimming competitions. Since then, numerous editions of Gymnasiade had been held. In 2018, Morocco staged the event, receiving more than 3000 young athletes representing 58 countries. It was the biggest edition so far and the first ever International Multisport event for youth held in Africa. The 2022 edition took place in May 2022 and was hosted in Normandy, France.

Editions

ISF World School Summer Games (Summer High School Games) U18
First held in 1974 the ISF World Gymnasiade is a multi-sport games organised by the International School Sport Federation for athletes in the under 18 age group. The 1974 athletics competition was not included as part of the main event held in Wiesbaden (FRG). The event was originally held every 2 years however after 1990 was only held every 4 years. From 1974 to 2009 only three compulsory sports made part of the event program: gymnastics, athletics, swimming.

ISF World School Summer Games (Summer High School Games) U15

ISF World School Winter Games (Winter High School Games)

Sports

Summer sports

Winter sports

See also
FINA Youth World Swimming Championships
Junior World Gymnastics Championships
SELL Student Games
Universiade
Youth Olympic Games
World Youth Championships in Athletics

References

External links

 
Multi-sport events
Children's sport
Recurring sporting events established in 1974
World youth sports competitions